USS Illinois (BB-7) was a pre-dreadnought battleship built for the United States Navy. Her keel was laid down in February 1897 at the Newport News Shipbuilding & Dry Dock Company, and she was launched in October 1898. She was commissioned in September 1901.

Illinois served with the European Squadron from 1902 to 1903, and with the North Atlantic Fleet until 1907, by which time it had been renamed the Atlantic Fleet. During this time, she accidentally collided with two other battleships. From December 1907 to February 1909, she circumnavigated the globe with the Great White Fleet. From November 1912, the ship was used as a training ship. She was lent to the state of New York in 1919 for use as a training vessel for the New York Naval Militia. The ship was converted into a floating armory in 1924 as a result of the Washington Naval Treaty, and it was as a floating armory, barracks and school that she served for the next thirty years. Prairie State was ultimately sold for scrap in 1956.

Description

Initial debate over whether to build a new low-freeboard design like the s in service or a higher-freeboard vessel like  (then under construction) led to a decision to adopt the latter type. The mixed secondary armament of  guns of previous classes was standardized to just 6-inch weapons to save weight and simplify ammunition supplies. Another major change was the introduction of modern, balanced turrets with sloped faces instead of the older "Monitor"-style turrets of earlier American battleships.

Steam was provided by eight coal-fired fire-tube boilers, which were ducted into a pair of funnels placed side by side. As built, she was fitted with heavy military masts, but these were replaced by cage masts in 1909. She had a crew of 536 officers and enlisted men, which increased to 690–713.

She was armed with a main battery of four /35 caliber guns in two twin-gun turrets on the centerline, one forward and aft. The secondary battery consisted of fourteen /40 caliber Mark IV guns, which were placed in individual casemates in the hull. For close-range defense against torpedo boats, she carried sixteen 6-pounder guns, also mounted individually in casemates along the side of the hull, and six 1-pounder guns. As was standard for capital ships of the period, Illinois carried four  torpedo tubes in deck mounted launchers.

Armor that was 6 in thick protected the secondary battery.

Service history

Construction – 1906
Illinois was laid down on 10 February 1897 by the Newport News Shipbuilding & Dry Dock Company of Newport News, Virginia. She was launched on 4 October 1898 and commissioned on 16 September 1901. The ship's first commander was Captain George A. Converse. Illinois was the first member of her class to be authorized, but the last to enter service. After commissioning, the ship began a shakedown cruise in the Chesapeake Bay, followed by initial training. She left the area on 20 November to test a new floating dry dock in Algiers, Louisiana. The ship was back in Newport News in January 1902. She served briefly as the flagship of Rear Admiral Robley D. Evans from 15 to 28 February; during this period, she took part in a reception for Prince Henry of Prussia, the brother of the German Kaiser.

On 30 April, now flying the flag of Rear Admiral A.S. Crowninshield, Illinois departed for a tour of Europe. She stopped in Naples, Italy on 18 May; here, Crowninshield took command of the European Squadron. Illinois took part in training exercises and ceremonial duties in European waters for the next two months, until 14 July, when she ran aground outside Oslo, Norway. She had to steam to Britain for repairs, which were carried out at Chatham. She left the port on 1 September for maneuvers with the rest of the fleet in the Mediterranean and South Atlantic.

On 10 January 1903, Illinois was reassigned to the North Atlantic Fleet, where she remained for the next four years. Her time was occupied with peacetime training exercises, gunnery practice, and various ceremonial activities. During this period, she was involved in two accidents with other battleships of the North Atlantic Fleet. The second collision occurred on 31 July 1906, and took place with her sister ship . Also that year, Illinois was the first ship to win the Battenberg Cup.

Great White Fleet

The ship's next significant action was the cruise of the Great White Fleet around the world, which started with a naval review for President Theodore Roosevelt in Hampton Roads. The cruise of the Great White Fleet was conceived as a way to demonstrate American military power, particularly to Japan. Tensions had begun to rise between the United States and Japan after the latter's victory in the Russo-Japanese War in 1905, particularly over racist opposition to Japanese immigration to the United States. The press in both countries began to call for war, and Roosevelt hoped to use the demonstration of naval might to deter Japanese aggression.

On 17 December, the fleet steamed out of Hampton Roads and cruised south to the Caribbean and then to South America, making stops in Port of Spain, Rio de Janeiro, Punta Arenas, and Valparaíso, among other cities. After arriving in Mexico in March 1908, the fleet spent three weeks conducting gunnery practice. The fleet then resumed its voyage up the Pacific coast of the Americas, stopping in San Francisco and Seattle before crossing the Pacific to Australia, stopping in Hawaii on the way. Stops in the South Pacific included Melbourne, Sydney, and Auckland.

After leaving Australia, the fleet turned north for the Philippines, stopping in Manila, before continuing on to Japan where a welcoming ceremony was held in Yokohama. Three weeks of exercises followed in Subic Bay in the Philippines in November. The ships passed Singapore on 6 December and entered the Indian Ocean; they coaled in Colombo before proceeding to the Suez Canal and coaling again at Port Said, Egypt. While there, the American fleet received word of an earthquake in Sicily. Illinois, the battleship , and the supply ship  were sent to assist the relief effort. The fleet called in several Mediterranean ports before stopping in Gibraltar, where an international fleet of British, Russian, French, and Dutch warships greeted the Americans. The ships then crossed the Atlantic to return to Hampton Roads on 22 February 1909, having traveled . There, they conducted a naval review for Theodore Roosevelt.

Later career

On 4 August 1909, Illinois was decommissioned in Boston. The ship then underwent a major modernization, receiving new "cage" masts and more modern equipment. She spent the next three years in active service with the fleet, before being decommissioned once more on 16 April 1912. She returned to service on 2 November for major training maneuvers with the Atlantic Fleet. Illinois made training cruises to Europe with midshipmen from the US Naval Academy in mid-1913 and 1914. By 1919, she had been decommissioned at the Philadelphia Navy Yard. On 23 October 1921, she was loaned to the New York Naval Militia for training purposes. The 1922 Washington Naval Treaty, which mandated significant reductions in naval strength, stipulated that Illinois must be rendered incapable of warlike action. As a result, she was converted into a floating armory at the New York Navy Yard in 1924 and was assigned to the New York Naval Reserve.

On 8 January 1941, the ship was reclassified from BB-7 to IX-15, and was renamed Prairie State so that her name could be used for the new battleship , which would be laid down a week later. Throughout World War II, she served with the U.S. Naval Reserve Midshipmen's School, based in New York. After the end of the war, Prairie State was kept as a barracks ship for a Naval Reserve unit. On 31 December 1955, the old ship was stricken and subsequently towed to Baltimore, where she was sold for scrap to the Bethlehem Steel Company on 18 May 1956.

Footnotes

Notes

Citations

References

Further reading

External links 

 Naval History & Heritage Command photos of the USS Illinois (Battleship # 7, later BB-7), 1901–1956. Later renamed Prairie State and designated IX-15. 
 

Illinois-class battleships
1898 ships
World War I battleships of the United States
Ships built in Newport News, Virginia